Mangalagiri railway station (station code: MAG), is a D-category station in Guntur railway division of Indian Railways. It provides rail connectivity to Mangalagiri which is the part of Mangalagiri Tadepalle Municipal Corporation and is situated on Guntur–Krishna Canal section of South Central Railway zone. It was awarded as tourist friendly station by Andhra Pradesh Tourism Development Corporation.

History 
The southern part of the West Coast State Railway (from Waltair to Vijayawada) was taken over by Madras Railway in 1901.

See also 
 List of railway stations in India

References 

Railway stations in Guntur district
Railway stations in Guntur railway division